SS President Cleveland was an American steam passenger ship that operated from 1947 to 1973. She became the Panamanian-flag passenger ship SS Oriental President in 1973 before being scrapped in 1974. She operated on routes in the Pacific Ocean.

History

Construction
President Cleveland was originally ordered by the Maritime Commission during World War II, as one of the Admiral-class Type P2-SE2-R1 transport ships, and intended to serve in the United States Navy with the name USS Admiral D. W. Taylor (AP-128). The ship was laid down on 28 August 1944 at the Bethlehem Steel shipyard in Alameda, California, but was cancelled on 16 December 1944.	

Redesigned for commercial passenger service, the ship was launched on 23 June 1946 with the name SS President Cleveland, and she was completed in 1947.

Service history
President Cleveland was operated by American President Lines under a bareboat charter. She appeared in the background during an Embarcadero waterfront scene in San Francisco, California, in the 1950 film Woman on the Run, featuring Ann Sheridan, at 46 minutes and 40 seconds into the film.

He was presumed to have jumped or fallen overboard.

President Cleveland appeared in the 1961 film Susan Slade, featuring Connie Stevens, Troy Donahue, Dorothy Maguire, and Lloyd Nolan, and was featured in a 1962 Britannica Films production called The Seaport, filmed in San Francisco. It is also seen at anchor in Tokyo Bay in the 1970 Japanese movie Hadaka no Jukyu-sai (Live Today, Die Tomorrow!). 

President Cleveland was sold to Oceanic Cruise Development, Inc. (C.Y. Tung Group) on 9 February 1973, re-registered in Panama, and renamed Oriental President. She was scrapped at Kaohsiung, Taiwan, in 1974.

References

 

1946 ships
Ships built in Alameda, California
Maritime incidents in 1958